Rudi Vervoort (born 20 November 1958) is a Brussels politician. He is the mayor of Evere since 1998 and member of the Brussels Parliament. He became the Minister-President of the Brussels-Capital Region on 7 May 2013 and is responsible for Local Authorities, Urban Development, Monuments and Sites, Environmental Maintenance (responsibility delegated to the Secretary of State Rachid Madrane), Development Cooperation and Regional Statistics.

He holds a degree in law.

Honours 
 2014: Commander of the Order of Leopold II
 2016: Cordon of the Order of the Rising Sun

References 

1958 births
Living people
Mayors of places in Belgium
Recipients of the Order of the Rising Sun, 3rd class
Members of the Parliament of the Brussels-Capital Region
People from Sint-Agatha-Berchem
Socialist Party (Belgium) politicians
21st-century Belgian politicians
Ministers-President of the Brussels-Capital Region